Argentine Nights is a 1940 musical film directed by Albert S. Rogell and starring The Andrews Sisters. It was their first film.

Premise
Three conmen go to Argentina to escape their creditors.

Production
The Ritz Brothers appeared in the film as part of a settlement with Universal following their non appearance in The Boys from Syracuse (1940). The film was meant to start production in May 1940, but the casting of the brothers meant the script had to be rewritten and shooting pushed back until 10 June. The songs 'Hit the Road' and 'Rhumboogie' were written by Hughie Prince.
George Reeves also sings in the film, in the role of "El Tigre", a bandit chief.

Cast
 Harry Ritz
 Patty Andrews
 Constance Moore
 Peggy Moran
 Kathryn Adams
 Paul Porcasi as Papa Viejos
 Al Ritz
 Jimmy Ritz

References

External links

American musical films
1940 films
1940 musical films
American black-and-white films
Films directed by Albert S. Rogell
1940s English-language films
1940s American films
English-language musical films